The UEFA Women's Euro 2013 qualifying – Group 3 was contested by six teams competing for one spot for the final tournament.

Standings

Fixtures
All times are UTC+2.

Goalscorers
9 goals
 Margrét Lára Viðarsdóttir
 Isabell Herlovsen

7 goals
 Fanny Vágó

6 goals
 Hólmfríður Magnúsdóttir

4 goals

 Annaelle Wiard
 Tessa Wullaert
 Aline Zeler
 Hege Hansen
 Maren Mjelde

3 goals

 Lilla Sipos
 Sara Björk Gunnarsdóttir
 Gry Tofte Ims
 Ingvild Stensland

2 goals

 Janice Cayman
 Audrey Demoustier
 Zsófia Rácz
 Dagný Brynjarsdóttir
 Katrín Jónsdóttir
 Dóra María Lárusdóttir
 Ashley Hutton
 Kirsty McGuinness
 Julie Nelson
 Marita Skammelsrud Lund
 Cecilie Pedersen
 Elise Thorsnes

1 goal

 Lien Mermans
 Stéphanie van Gils
 Valentina Gospodinova
 Zsanett Jakabfi
 Anett Dombai-Nagy
 Anita Pádár
 Szabina Tálosi
 Bernadett Zágor
 Kristín Ýr Bjarnadóttir
 Fanndís Friðriksdóttir
 Sandra Jessen
 Katrín Ómarsdóttir
 Rachel Furness
 Simone Magill
 Caragh Milligan
 Catherine O'Hagan
 Jessica Stephens
 Solfrid Andersen
 Marit Christensen
 Caroline Hansen
 Mari Knudsen
 Lene Mykjåland

1 own goal
 Borislava Kireva (playing against Northern Ireland)
 Ashley Hutton (playing against Hungary)

References
Group 3

3
2011–12 in Bulgarian football
2012–13 in Bulgarian football
2011–12 in Northern Ireland association football
2012–13 in Northern Ireland association football
2011 in Norwegian women's football
2012 in Norwegian women's football
2011 in Icelandic football
2012 in Icelandic football
2011–12 in Belgian football
2012–13 in Belgian football
2011–12 in Hungarian football
2012–13 in Hungarian football
qual